Danny Seemiller is an American table tennis coach and former professional player. He was the United States Olympic head coach and is the current head coach of the South Bend Table Tennis Club. He has an unorthodox playing style called the Seemiller grip, which he is famous for inventing in the 1970s.

Career
Seemiller began playing table tennis as an early adolescent in the 1960s. By 1972, he was the top player on the U.S. Men's National Team. He won five United States Men's Singles Championships (1976, 1977, 1980, 1982, and 1983). Seemiller reached #19 in the World Rankings and is considered one of the best American  table tennis athletes of all time.

From 1990 to 1995 he served as President of United States Table Tennis Association (now called USA Table Tennis). He was inducted into the USA Table Tennis Hall of Fame in 1995.

In 1996, he moved to New Carlisle, Indiana and became the head coach for the South Bend Table Tennis Club. At South Bend, he has developed top US players Mark Hazinski, Joey Cochran, Jared Lynch, A.J. Brewer, and Dan Seemiller Jr, all of whom are former members of the US National Team.

Personal life
Seemiller was a dual sport athlete as a teen, playing both table tennis and baseball. Seemiller was drafted by the Pittsburgh Pirates in the 1970s as a shortstop/2nd baseman, but declined their farm league team offer to further pursue his table tennis career. Danny is an author of two books, "Winning Table Tennis" (1996) and "Revelations of a Ping-Pong Champion" (2016).

References

American male table tennis players
Living people
People from St. Joseph County, Indiana
1954 births